Leicester Ivanhoe Cricket Club Ground is a cricket ground in Kirby Muxloe, Leicestershire.  The first recorded match on the ground was in 1952, when the Leicestershire Second XI played the Nottinghamshire Second XI.  In addition, the ground has also held 2 Second XI Championship matches.

The ground held its first Women's One Day International in the 1973 Women's Cricket World Cup between International XI women and Jamaica women.  The next held 2 Women's ODI's in the 1990 Women's European Championship when Denmark women played Ireland women and finally with England women playing Ireland women, in what is to date the final Women's ODI held at the ground.

In local domestic cricket, the ground is the home venue of Leicester Ivanhoe Cricket Club. who play in the Leicestershire Premier Cricket League.

References

External links
Leicester Ivanhoe Cricket Club Ground on CricketArchive
Leicester Ivanhoe Cricket Club Ground on Cricinfo

Cricket grounds in Leicestershire
Sports venues completed in 1952